The Suzan are an all-female pop rock band from Japan formed in 2004. It consists of the sisters Rie and Saori and friends Nico. Their music is considered multi-genre, with elements of pop, wild dance, punk, and garage rock. The Suzan's song "Come Come" gained notoriety for playing in Verizon Wireless advertisement for the NFL 2011. With their album Golden Week For The Poco Poco Beat (at indie label Fool's Gold Records, 2010), they started a collaboration with Swedish musician and producer Björn Yttling from Peter Bjorn and John, which are among the many bands they have been touring with internationally.

Members

 Rie - keyboards, guitar
 Saori - vocals, guitar
 Nico - percussion

Former members
 Ikue - bass

Discography

Albums
 2006: Suzan Galaxy
 2010: Golden Week For The Poco Poco Beat

EPs
 2004: Suzan Kingdom

References

External links
The Suzan on Facebook
The Suzan on Myspace

Japanese musical groups
All-female bands
Musical quartets
Musical groups established in 2004